The Diocese of  Vĩnh Long is a Roman Catholic diocese in southern Vietnam. The current bishop is Peter Huỳnh Văn Hai, since October 2015.

The creation of the diocese in present form was declared November 24, 1960.

The diocese covers an area of 6,772 km², and is a suffragan diocese of the Archdiocese of Ho Chi Minh City.

By 2014, the diocese of Vĩnh Long had about 199,404 Catholics (4.5% of the population), 179 priests and 209 parishes.

St. Anne’s Cathedral in Vĩnh Long town has been assigned as the Cathedral of the diocese.

Ordinaries

Vicar Apostolic
 Pierre-Martin Ngô Đình Thục (8 Jan 1938 Appointed - 24 Nov 1960 Appointed, Archbishop of Huế)

Bishops
 Antoine Nguyễn Văn Thiện (24 November 1960 Appointed - 12 July 1968 Resigned)
 Jacques Nguyễn Văn Mầu (12 July 1968 Appointed - 3 July 2001 Retired)
 Thomas Nguyễn Văn Tân (3 July 2001 Succeeded - 17 August 2013 Died)
 Peter Huỳnh Văn Hai (7 October 2015 Appointed - present)

References

External links
Official web-site of Diocese of Vinh Long

Vinh Long
Christian organizations established in 1960
Roman Catholic dioceses and prelatures established in the 20th century
Vinh Long, Roman Catholic Diocese of
1960 establishments in South Vietnam